VWE may refer to:

 Variable-width encoding
 Verden–Walsrode Railway in Germany
 Van Wyck Expressway in New York City